Roberto Delgado may refer to:

Roberto Delgado, alternative name for Horst Wende, German bandleader, arranger and composer
Roberto Alfonso Delgado, Spanish footballer
Roberto Delgado (referee), Cuban football referee
Roberto Delgado (swimmer), Ecuadorian swimmer
Roberto Delgado (Salsa musician), Salsa musician from Panama

See also
Bob Delgado, Welsh footballer